Dermatobranchus nigropunctatus is a species of sea slug, a nudibranch, a marine gastropod mollusc in the family Arminidae.

Distribution
This species occurs in the Indo-Pacific region. It was described from Japan. It has been reported from Eastern Australia. but this record refers to Dermatobranchus dendronephthyphagus.

References

Arminidae
Gastropods described in 1949